Michel Pablo (24 August 1911, Alexandria, Egypt – 17 February 1996, Athens) was the pseudonym of Michalis N. Raptis, a Trotskyist leader of Greek origin.

Early activism 
Pablo joined the Trotskyist faction of the Group "Archeion marxismou" in 1928, and subsequently followed that faction when it split in 1929. He continued to be deeply involved in the factional struggles, splits and re-unifications of the Greek followers of Leon Trotsky until in 1934, this group joined forces with another Trotskyist group, led by Pandelis Pouliopoulos, resulting in the foundation of the Organisation of International Communists of Greece (OKDE).

During the 1936 military dictatorship of Ioannis Metaxas, Pablo was arrested and exiled in the Aegean island of Folegandros. There he was not admitted by the orthodox communists, also in exile, so he joined the company of cattle and horse thieves, who at that time were punished with exile. In Folegandros he met his future wife Elli Dyovounioti. Together they escaped from the island and later from Greece.

At the End of 1937, they went to Switzerland and finally to Paris, France, where Pablo represented the Greek Trotskyists at the founding conference of the Fourth International, which was held just outside of Paris in 1938.

When Nazi-Germany occupied France in 1940, Pablo stayed in Paris where he organized illegal propaganda and was involved in the re-construction and re-unification of the French Trotskyist movement, which was operating underground into the Provisional European Secretariat of the Frouth International.

Leadership of the Fourth International 
By 1944 he was fully involved with the movement, and was elected the organizational secretary of its European Bureau, which had re-established contact between the Trotskyist parties. After the war, Pablo became the central leader of the Fourth International with the support of the SWP of the United States and James P. Cannon. Pablo played a key role in re-unifying, re-centralising and re-orienting the International. In 1946 Pablo visited Greece to successfully reunify the four separate Trotskyist parties. Pablo and Ernest Mandel were instrumental in these years in winning the Fourth International to a position that asserted that the Eastern European states conquered by the Soviet Armed Forces in 1944-45 had by 1948 become what they described as deformed workers' states.

Turn to the mass-parties. 
In the uncertain aftermath of World War II, when the Trotskyists were numerically dwarfed by the mass communist parties and their hopes for a revolutionary breakthrough were dashed, Pablo also advanced a new tactic for the FI from its third world-congress in 1951 onward. He argued that a Third World War, which was believed by many people to be imminent. In his document "Where are we going", Pablo writes "such a war would take on, from the very beginning the character of an international civil war, especially in Europe and in Asia. These continents would rapidly pass over under the control of the Soviet bureaucracy, of the Communist Parties, or of the revolutionary masses". Splits of revolutionary dissenters were likely to develop in the traditional mass parties of the working class. To gain influence, win members, establish a Marxist wing and most importantly to avoid becoming isolated sectarian circles with no connection to the working class, the Trotskyists should — where possible — join, or in Trotskyist terminology enter, the mass communist or social democratic (Labour) parties. This form of Entryism was intended to be a long-term tactic. It was understood by all that the FI would retain its political identity, and its own press. Entry was seldom carried out without splits or even violent conflict within the local propaganda circles, but proved to greatly add to local groups' flexibility where it was put into practice. Independent work should continue in Latin America, Ceylon, the United States, India.

The innovative part of Pablo's proposed "Entryism sui generis", which was accepted by the Tenth Plenum of the Third World-Congress of the Fourth International was in the approach to the Stalinist parties wherever they were majority working-class party. Due to the extremely bureaucratic leadership of the Stalinist parties, Trotskyists would be prevented from proceeding in the same way as they would with reformist mass-parties, and had to maintain separate independent work, which "must be understood as having its chief aim to assist the work of entry".

These changes in policy were adopted by the Fourth International in the early months of 1952.

The "Pabloite" Fourth International 
Under the weight of the controversy that was caused by the resolutions adopted at the Third World-Congress of the Fourth International, factions in the US-SWP as well as the British section of the FI started to build a faction within the International, which broke away in 1953, constituting the International Committee of the Fourth International.

Rise and decline of Stalinism 
The Fourth World-Congress of the Fourth International was entitled "Rise and Decline of Stalinism". Inspired by the Cuban Revolution as well as the Tito-Stalin split demonstrating that the Stalinist Communist Parties may not unalterably subordinate to Stalin, Pablo also started to argue that even the Stalinist parties who were in power in various countries at the time could be pushed into taking leadership in revolutionary conflicts by the mass activity of the working class, which caused further controversy and division within the ranks of the FI. Pablo was speculating on a split between the Stalinist regimes in China and the USSR as early as 1951. Pablo writes: "the rise of Communist Parties to power is not the consequence of a capacity of Stalinism to struggle for the Revolution, does not alter the internationally counter-revolutionary role of Stalinism, but it is the product of an exceptional combination of circumstances which has imposed the seizure of power either upon the Soviet bureaucracy (in the case of the European buffer zone) or upon certain Communist Parties (Yugoslavia, China)".

Colonial Revolution and Guerrillaism 
The Fifth World-Congress in 1957 recognized for the first time that a major world depression was not likely in the near future. The central document emphasized the basic role of workers' democracy, not only as political factor, but also as indispensable for economic development. The second document was on "Colonial Revolution since the End of the Second World War", focusing on conflicts between French imperialism and the Vietminh, the Algerian war, and the Suez crisis which led to the nationalisation of the Suez Canal. The document argued that since the world revolution had first been successful in the east, instead of - how it was expected by Marxist theoreticians - in the Western countries. Colonial revolution, which could only be victorious as permanent revolution, thus was an integral part of the world revolution, and constituted a link between October and the triumph of the world revolution. The document contained a detailed study of the colonial movements, examined the respective roles of proletariat and peasantry in the colonial countries and emphasised the importance of guerrilla warfare in colonial countries, not only as military factor but as a factor in the organisation and political education of the masses. The congress insisted on the necessity for the Trotskyist movement, especially in the imperialist countries to devote a large part of its activity to aiding colonial revolution.

Pablo was personally engaged in supporting the Algerian national liberation struggle against France. In 1959 he set up and operated a secret munitions factory, hidden within a citrus plantation in the Moroccan city of Kentire, where they manufactured a lightweight version of the Sten submachinegun while also overseeing a workshop on the Dutch-German border that produced counterfeit passports and cash to support the FLN.

Arrest in Amsterdam 
In 1960, it was decided to move the headquarters of the Fourth International from Paris to Amsterdam because of the return of Charles de Gaulle to power, which made it less advisable to stay in Paris. In Amsterdam, it was thought, the Trotskyists would be freer to operate, and they would be closer to the European headquarters of the Algerian revolution, which was in Cologne.

In July 1960 he was arrested in Amsterdam along with Sal Santen. A campaign for his release was launched by Jean-Paul Sartre. After Pablo's Arrest, it was decided to move the International Secretariat to Rome, with the reason being that of the members of the Bureau of the Secretariat, Pierre Frank, Ernest Mandel and Livio Maitan, Maitan was the only one who could devote full-time to work for the IS. Pablo opposed this decision.

In 1961, Pablo was finally sentenced to 15 months imprisonment, and liberated at the end of his trial. After his release, he went to Great Britain, where through the intervention of supporters of his in Morocco, he was provided with a Moroccan passport. He took refuge in Morocco. After the victory of the Algerian revolution in 1962, he became an adviser in the economic reconstruction in the Government of Ahmed Ben-Bella. Pablo was also part of a four-man committee tasked with drawing up a decree concerned with property which had been seized by the Algerians after the French colonials had fled the country. He served in these positions until the Algerian government was overthrown in the 1965 Algerian coup d'état.

Reunification 
Meanwhile, in 1963, ICFI groups around the Socialist Workers Party were moving back towards unity with the ISFI, sharing common positions towards the Cuban revolution. Pablo was regarded by the SWP as a barrier to that unification. The world congress in 1963 formed the reunified Fourth International. Pablo moved a counter-resolution at the 1963 reunification congress, as well as the main resolution on Algeria, and was elected to the international executive committee. Tensions grew, and Pablo and his African Bureau were outside the International by the end of 1965 for partly disputed reasons: in the International's view, Pablo's tendency's orientation on what was commonly portrayed as "Third-World Guerrillaism" broke with the International publicly and placed itself outside the FI. Being busy with the situation in Algeria also made it difficult for him to defend himself against accusations leveraged against him by the FI's leadership. By then, Pablo had key political differences with the FI. In addition, Pablo was critical on the prospect of re-unification of the Trotskyist movement as advocated by Ernest Mandel, Joseph Hansen and others.

Pablo himself declared his differences with the United Secretariat as follows:

 Disagreement with the assessment of Maoism as evolving towards revolutionary Marxist positions to which it was necessary to offer critical support.
 Disagreement with the assessment of the Khrushchev tendency of the Soviet bureaucracy as simple personal quarrel. Pablo had maintained that the Khrushchev tendency was more receptive to pressures of Soviet society than the Stalinist tendency that sought to overthrow it.
 Disagreement with the support given by the executive committee of the United Secretariat to Holden Roberto against the People's Movement for the Liberation of Angola (MPLA) in Angola. Pablo favored supporting the latter.
Publicly defending those positions would lead to Pablo and his supporters to be accused of having violated democratic centralism, thus placing themselves outside of the Fourth International. This was followed by expulsions of Pablo's supporters from the United Secretariat.

Outside the Fourth International 
During the Colonels' dictatorship in Greece in 1967 Pablo, together with Andreas Papandreou established a network to assist resistance members' escape abroad.

The International Revolutionary Marxist Tendency. 
After being expelled, Pablo and his supporters regrouped as the International Revolutionary Marxist Tendency of the Fourth International (TMRIQI) Internationally. This group dropped the reference to the Fourth International during its meetings in 1972 and at the same time proclaimed it no longer considered itself Trotskyist nor a party of world revolution. Instead they considered themselves a Marxist tendency fostering self-government on all levels within social movements. This coincided with Pablo being politically active in Chile, under Allende's government.

In 1979, the TMRI would send an open letter to members of the Fourth International, calling for the need to "develop new directions, new forms of struggle and of organization" as well as "the elaboration of a transition program based on socialist autogestion". The United Secretariat paid little attention to this letter. A resolution of the Seventh International Conference of the TMRI in 1980 declares the adoption of Christian Rakovsky's theory of "bureaucratic centrism".

After the fall of the Greek Junta, he returned to Greece, played a role in the founding of the Pan-Hellenic Socialist Party (PASOK) and, from 1981, served as Special Advisor to Prime Minister Andreas Papandreou; The sections of the IRMT rejoined the reunified Fourth International in 1994 and 1995, although the agreement was not applied in Pablo's individual case.

Unusually for a revolutionary, his funeral was a state event in his native Greece. This is explained by his personal friendship from the 1930s with Papandreou who had been a Trotskyist in his youth. Pablo's motto was: "The meaning of life is life itself" (Νόημα της ζωής είναι η ίδια η ζωή).

References

Bibliography
Michel Raptis, Revolution and Counter Revolution in Chile: A Dossier on Workers' Participation in the Revolutionary Process (London: Allison & Busby, 1974).
Michel Raptis, Socialism, Democracy & Self-Management: Political Essays (London: Allison & Busby, 1980). 
Michel Raptis, Étude pour une politique agraire en Algerie.
Pierre Frank, The Fourth International: The Long March of the Trotskyists.
Francois Moreau, Combats et debats de la Quatrieme Internationale.
Klaus Leggewie, Koffertrager. Das Algerienprojekt der Deutsche Linken in Adenauer Deutschland.
Lena Hoff, Resistance in Exile. A study of the political correspondence between Nicolas Calas and Michel Raptis 1967-72,
Robert J. Alexander, International Trotskyism, 1929-1985: A Documented Analysis of the Movement.

External links
Genesis of Pabloism by the Spartacist League
Marxist Internet Archive on Pablo
The Lubitz TrotskyanaNet provides a bio-bibliographical sketch of Michel Pablo
Obituary by the Greek state news agency Includes Papandreou's comment on Pablo's death
 Resistance in exile – a study of the political correspondence between Nicolas Calas and Michalis Raptis (Pablo) 1967-72

1911 births
1996 deaths
Politicians from Alexandria
National Technical University of Athens alumni
Greek communists
Greek Marxists
Greek Trotskyists
Egyptian people of Greek descent
Egyptian emigrants to Greece